Rahmatabad-e Bozorg (also Romanized as Raḩmatābād-e Bozorg; also known as Raḩmatābād) is a village in Dashtabi-ye Gharbi Rural District, Dashtabi District, Buin Zahra County, Qazvin Province, Iran. At the 2006 census, its population was 1,283, in 344 families.

References 

Populated places in Buin Zahra County